William George Maton M.D. (31 January 1774 – 30 March 1835) was an English physician, a society doctor who became associated with the British royal family. He published on natural history and antiquarian topics.

Life
The son of George Maton, a wine merchant, was born at Salisbury, 31 January 1774. He attended Salisbury grammar school, and in July 1790 entered The Queen's College, Oxford. While there he became interested in botany, and encountered John Sibthorp.

On 18 March 1794 Maton was elected a fellow of the Linnean Society, came to know Sir James Edward Smith the botanist. He became vice-president of the society; and the members showed their regard for him by calling a woodpecker, a shell-fish, and a genus of plants after him. In that year he graduated B.A. at Oxford, and in 1797 M.A.

Maton began medical study at Westminster Hospital, and 11 July 1798 graduated M.B. at Oxford, and 15 April 1801 M.D. He was elected a fellow of the College of Physicians of London 30 September 1802, became Gulstonian lecturer in 1803, censor 1804, 1813, and 1824, treasurer 1814 to 1820, and Harveian orator 1815. He was physician to the Westminster Hospital 1800–8.

During the Weymouth "season" Maton used to practise there. One day as he was walking an equerry summoned him to Queen Charlotte. She asked him to name a specimen (of Calamagrostis epigejos, as he knew) which one of the princesses fond of botany had obtained. In this way he had an introduction to the royal family. In 1816 he was appointed physician extraordinary to Queen Charlotte, and in 1820 attended the Duke of Kent in his last illness. He afterwards became physician to the Duchess of Kent, and to the infant Princess Victoria.

Maton's practice increased, and was only exceeded by that of Sir Henry Halford. His father, who had died in 1816, was then deeply in debt, and by 1827 Maton had paid all that was owing. He bought a country seat near Downton, Wiltshire, but six months later became very ill, and died 30 March 1835 at his house in Spring Gardens, London.

Works
In 1797 Maton published at Salisbury, in two volumes, Observations relative chiefly to the Natural History, Picturesque Scenery, and Antiquities of the Western Counties of England, made chiefly in the Years 1794 and 1796. The initial tour was made with his friend Charles Hatchett and Thomas Rackett the botanist. This is a record of travels in Dorset, Devon, Cornwall, and Somerset.

Maton published papers in the Transactions of the Linnean Society. In the London Medical Journal, vol. v., he published a paper on cinchona, in which he describes his discovery of the alkaline principle of the bark. He published on history: he wrote an account of a conventual seal found at Salisbury in the Gentleman's Magazine for 1792, and parts of the Salisbury Guide, and John Hutchins's History of Dorset, as well as a paper on Stonehenge in Archæologia for 1794. He published also three papers in the Transactions of the College of Physicians.

Notes

Attribution

External links
 

1774 births
1835 deaths
19th-century English medical doctors
Fellows of the Royal Society
English naturalists